Lagos Island (Ìsàlẹ̀ Èkó) is the principal and central local government area (LGA) in Lagos, it was the capital of Lagos State until 1957. It is part of the Lagos Division.  As of the preliminary 2006 Nigerian census, the LGA had a population of 209,437 in an area of 8.7 km2.  The LGA only covers the western half of Lagos Island; the eastern half is simply referred to as Lagos Island East LCDA.

Overview
Lying on Lagos Lagoon, a large protected harbour on the coast of Africa, the island is home to the Yoruba fishing village of Eko, which grew into the modern city of Lagos. The city has now spread out to cover the neighboring islands as well as the adjoining mainland.

Lagos Island is connected to the mainland by three large bridges (the Carter Bridge, the Eko Bridge and the Third Mainland Bridge) which cross Lagos Lagoon to the district of Ebute Metta. It is also linked to the neighboring island of Ikoyi and to Victoria Island. The Lagos harbor district of Apapa faces the western side of the island. Forming the main commercial district of Lagos, Lagos Island plays host to the main government buildings, shops and offices. The Catholic and Anglican Cathedrals, as well as the Central Mosque, are located here.

Historically, Lagos Island (Isale Eko) was home to the Brazilian Quarter of Lagos where majority of the slave trade returnees from Brazil stayed. Many families lived on Broad Street in the Marina.

The poor eastern side of the island contains the main markets and the poor housing. The island is extremely crowded and congested with people and tribes. And government attempts have been made to build new roads out over the lagoon in order to improve traffic flows. It is the part of Lagos where the Oba (king) of Lagos resides. It is also believed that the Eyo festival can only be held in this part of Lagos.

Economy

Most Nigerian banks' head offices are located on Lagos Island.First Bank of Nigeria is one of the Nigerian banks with its head office in Marina, Lagos Island. Another bank that has its head office situated in Lagos Island is the United Bank for Africa (UBA). Other medium and large-scale businesses such as real estate consultancy firms, electrical appliances manufacturers and retail stores are based in Marina, Lagos Island.

Landmarks and tourist attractions

Tom Jones Memorial Hall And Library
Located on Nnamdi Azikiwe Street, Idumota, formerly Victoria St, Tom Jones Memorial hall is noteworthy as the venue of the call for positive action by zikists in November 1948. The hall was built by trustees selected by Mr Thomas Jones who died in 1913, In his will, he bequeathed the land and funds for a hall and library in his memorial.

Freedom Park

Freedom Park is becoming a major tourist attraction and it is located on Lagos Island. The park was formerly a prison yard, back when the country was still under colonial rule and it was known then as Her Majesty's Broad Street Prisons. Freedom park was created to serve as a national memorial in remembrance of the nation's founding fathers who struggled against colonial rule and fought for the country's independence. The park was opened in 2010 to celebrate Nigeria's 50th independence celebration. The park is now a tourist attraction to both locals and foreigners and you can actually find historical statues all over the park. There is also an amphi-theatre which holds concerts, music shows and drama presentations. You can also relax by the numerous ponds and fountains at the park or visit the Wole Soyinka Art Gallery to view unique art presentations.

Marina road

The Lagos Marina is host to a number of office buildings, and other structures such as the Bookshop House which was formerly owned by CMS and the Cathedral Church of Christ. Due to the conditions of the soil, the foundations of most of the tall buildings are either piled or raft. Buildings along the marina include National House now occupied by Shell and it is the first tall office building at Marina. The former Central Bank headquarters and the Investment House, headquarters of Bank of Industry were both built-in 1960. The land on which the Investment House was built previously housed the Grand Hotel before it was demolished. New Africa House of UAC, Elder Dempster House, Nigerian Ports Authority head office and National Electric Power Authority's former headquarters are all located along the marina.

Notable Indigene 
 Babajide Sanwo-Olu
 Ibiyemi Olatunji-Bello
 Justice G.B.A Coker

Important places at Lagos Island

References

External links

 Lagos Island Local Government
 lagos employment

 
Islands of Lagos
Local Government Areas in Lagos State
Islands of Yorubaland
Central business districts in Nigeria